Events in the year 2018 in Honduras.

Incumbents
 President – Juan Orlando Hernández
 National congress president – Mauricio Oliva

Events
9 January – 2018 Swan Islands earthquake, off the coast of Honduras

Deaths

8 January – Juan Carlos García, footballer (b. 1988).

17 June – William Chong Wong, economist and politician (b. 1950)

11 December – Walter Williams, footballer (b. 1983).

22 December – Roberto Suazo Córdova, politician, President of Honduras from 1982 until 1986 (b. 1927).

References

 
2010s in Honduras
Years of the 21st century in Honduras
Honduras
Honduras